Clarkson is a near-ghost town in Milam County, Texas, United States,  northeast of Cameron, with a reported population now of just 10 residents. Located on Farm-to-Market Road 1445, Clarkson's population peaked at 50 in the 1940s, and at that time the town had two schools: a one-teacher school for 43 white students, and a two-teacher school for 105 black students. Both consolidated with the Cameron Independent School District in the 1950s, as the population dropped.

References

Ghost towns in Milam County, Texas
Ghost towns in Central Texas